Neslihan Atagül Doğulu (born 20 August 1992) is a Turkish actress. She is best known for her role in Kara Sevda (2015–2017), a series sold to more than 110 countries and the only Turkish TV series winner of the International Emmy Award (2017). She had leading roles in the series Fatih Harbiye (2013–2014) and in the films Araf and Senden Bana Kalan. Throughout her acting career, she has received numerous awards and accolades, including the Academy Award for "Best Actress" at the Tokyo International Film Festival.

Biography 
Neslihan Atagül was born on 20 August 1992 in Istanbul. Her father was a driver and her mother a housewife. Her father is of Circassian and her mother of Belarusian descent.

She studied theater at the Yeditepe University.

Career

Early years 
Atagül set out to become an actress when she was only 8 years old. In 2005, at age 13, she found the number for the Erberk Agency, owned by Neşe Erberk; she got Erberk's agency address and went with her mother to register. A month later, she acted in her first commercial.

In 2006, she made her acting debut in the film İlk Aşk, for which she won the first prize of her career as "Promising Young Actress". Shortly after, she got a role in the series Yaprak Dökümü and, in the following years, she appeared in other series such as Canım Babam or Hayat Devam Ediyor.

In 2012, she was noted for her starring role in the film Araf, for which she won the Academy Award for "Best Actress" at the prestigious Tokyo International Film Festival.

2013–2014: Fatih Harbiye 
In 2013, Atagül landed her first leading role in the romance drama series Fatih Harbiye, alongside Kadir Doğulu. The series is an adaptation of the eponymous book by Turkish writer Peyami Safa, published in 1931, where she played Neriman Solmaz, a motherless young woman from the mahala who is engaged to her lifelong boyfriend until she meets Macit Arcaoğlu (Kadir Doğulu).

Fatih Harbiye premiered on 31 August 2013 on the Fox channel, but later moved to Show TV. It ran for two seasons and ended on 10 December 2014.

2015–2017: Kara Sevda and rising popularity 
In 2015, one of the most important and most beloved roles of her career would arrive, that of Nihan Sezin in the melodrama Kara Sevda, which became the first Turkish series to be awarded the International Emmy Award for Best Telenovela in 2017. The series also received the special jury award at the Seoul International Drama Awards.

Kara Sevda has become one of the most watched Turkish series in the world, being translated into more than 50 languages and broadcast in more than 110 countries such as Russia, Iran, Slovenia, Uruguay and Greece. During its broadcast in the United States for Hispanic community, it became the most watched non-Spanish series on the Univision channel.

Thanks to her performance in this series, Atagül won four awards and her popularity and recognition skyrocketed, not only in Turkey but also internationally, especially in Arab countries.

She made her debut on online streaming platforms with the series Dip (2018) alongside İlker Kaleli.

2019–2021: Sefirin Kızı 
In 2019, Neslihan Atagül returned to the small screen with the series Sefirin Kızı, playing Nare.

The series aired on Star TV for two seasons with a total of 52 episodes. It premiered on 16 December 2019 and ended on 11 May 2021, and for her performance she received the "Best Actress" award at the Izmir Artemis International Film Festival. However, midway through the series, she announced her withdrawal from the series due to health problems as she suffered from leaky gut syndrome.

Present 
Currently, Atagül is immersed in a new professional project, Hadsiz Magazine, which will bring impressive photographs, exclusive interviews with great guests.

Personal life
Neslihan started dating her Fatih Harbiye co-star, Kadir Doğulu, in October 2013. They got engaged in November 2015, and were married in July 2016.

Filmography

Awards and nominations

References

Living people
Turkish people of Belarusian descent
Turkish people of Circassian descent
Turkish stage actresses
Turkish film actresses
Turkish child actresses
Actresses from Istanbul
Turkish television actresses
21st-century Turkish actresses
1992 births